Cyclopteropsis lindbergi is a species of lumpfish native to the Bering Sea, the Sea of Okhotsk, and the Sea of Japan. It is found at a depth range of 20 to 200 m (66 to 656 ft), and it may reach 7 cm (2.8 inches) in total length.

References 

lindbergi
Fish described in 1930
Fish of the Bering Sea
Fish of the North Pacific
Taxa named by Vladimir Soldatov